Waagaard is a Norwegian surname. Notable people with the surname include:

Helge Ellingsen Waagaard (1781–1817), Norwegian farmer and politician
Ivar Anton Waagaard (born 1955), Norwegian musician
Michele Waagaard (born 1980), Norwegian-born Thai model, singer and radio host

Norwegian-language surnames